Lüshun railway station (in ) is located in Lüshunkou District of Dalian City, China, and is the final stop of the Dalian-Lushun branch of the Dalian-Harbin railway. It sits on the east side of the Long River, within a hundred meters of the Lüshun Naval Port, its building being of the Russian-style wooden architecture.

Currently, it is served by two passenger train services a day from Dalian.

In 2006, Lushun West railway station opened on another branch of the Dalian-Lushun railway branch, for Bohai Train Ferry.

Lushun has two train stations, but the photo of the train station does not match the actual photo.

This train station was rebuilt by the Japanese in 1905, but it retains Russian-style architecture.

History

 1898, Russia obtained the Kwantung Leased Territory and started construction of Chinese Eastern Railway
 1900, construction of Lushun railway station was started
 1903, Lushun railway station was completed and put into operation
 1904, operation was halted due to the Russo-Japanese War
 1905, after the fall of the Russian Lushun to the Japanese, the Russian broad gauge of the Dalian-Lushun branch line was changed to the Japanese narrow gauge
 1906, was placed under the control of South Manchuria Railway
 1907, the railway was changed to the standard gauge
 1945, after the fall of the Japanese Lushun, operated jointly by China and the Soviet Union
 1952, returned to China
 1985, became a Cultural Heritage site of Dalian City
 2005, rebuilt, retaining the original design

See also
 Dalian & Lüshunkou District
 South Manchuria Railway
 Russo-Japanese War
 Rail gauge
 Bohai Train Ferry#Lushun West Station
 Dalian railway station

References

Railway stations in China opened in 1903
Railway stations in Liaoning